Cristóbal de Oñate (1504, Spain—October 6, 1567, Pánuco, Zacatecas) was a Spanish Basque explorer, conquistador and colonial official in New Spain. He is considered the founder of the contemporary city of Guadalajara in 1531, as well as other places in Nueva Galicia (western New Spain).

Background
Oñate was born in 1504 in Vitoria, a town in the Basque province of Álava, Spain. His father was Juan Perez de Oñate and his mother was Osaña González. He was born into the House of Haro, whose origins go back to the Middle Ages. He was a grandson of Pedro de Baeza, Señor de Narrihondo, one of Spain's last feudal lords.

He was a valued officer, a good executive, and one of the first millionaires in North America. He discovered the richest silver mines on the continent -  the mines of Zacatecas, in the barren and desolate plateau where now stands the Mexican city of that name.

Activities in New Spain
Oñate arrived in New Spain in 1524 as the assistant to Rodrigo de Albornoz. Charles V, Holy Roman Emperor and king of Spain had made Albornoz auditor, one of five royal officials named to oversee Cortés's government in the colony.

In New Spain, he was reunited with his twin nephews Juan and Vicente de Zaldívar y Oñate. Cristobal de Oñate contracted marriage with Catalina de Salazar de la Cadena, daughter of Gonzalo de Salazar and Catalina De La Cadena Maluenda. This was Catalina's second marriage. Her maternal uncle Antonio De La Cadena Maluenda, was Treasurer of New Spain. Gonzalo Salazar was a high-ranking official in the Royal Treasury of the colony, and at times a member of the junta that ruled New Spain.

In 1529 he was a part of the expedition of Nuño Beltrán de Guzmán that conquered the western part of Mexico (the current states of Nayarit, Jalisco, Colima, Aguascalientes and parts of Sinaloa, Zacatecas and San Luis Potosí). This brutal conquest took only a few years, and the newly conquered region became known as Nueva Galicia. The foundation of the cities of Compostela and Tepic in present-day Nayarit and Guadalajara and Zacatecas is attributed to Oñate.

In 1531 (probably January), Oñate founded a small town near Nochistlán to which the name Guadalajara was given. Two years later Beltrán de Guzmán visited the city, and at the request of its inhabitants, who were fearful of Indian attacks and lacked sufficient water, he ordered it moved to Tonalá. This occurred on May 24, 1533. Later, after Beltrán had returned to Spain, it was moved again, to a site near Tlacotan (northeast of modern Zapopan). This occurred probably between October 1541 and February of the following year.

During the conquest of Zacatecas rich silver mines were discovered that made Cristóbal de Oñate and his partners Diego de Ibarra and Juan de Tolosa among the richest men in New Spain. Oñate settled at the Pánuco mine in Zacatecas, where five of his six children were born. One of his sons, Juan de Oñate, married Isabel de Tolosa Cortes-Moctezuma, granddaughter of conquistador Hernán Cortés and greatgranddaughter of the last Aztec Emperor Moctezuma Xocoyotzin. Juan became an explorer of western North America and founder of the first European settlement on the upper Rio Grande in the present U.S. state of New Mexico. Both Juan and his son Cristóbal served as Spanish governors of Nuevo Mexico.

Cristóbal de Oñate served as governor of the province of Nueva Galicia on three occasions. He attempted without success to suppress the Caxcan Indians during the Mixton War in 1541 and was later accused by Caxcan leader Francisco Tenamaztle of murdering and exploiting Indians.  Besides being a conquistador, official and mineowner, he was a farmer, rancher and encomendero. Although he was a lieutenant of Beltrán de Guzmán, perhaps the bloodiest conquistador in the history of New Spain, Onate seems also to have had a more benign side.  He was a benefactor of the cities he founded. A generous spirit, he offered meals to the needy on a daily basis throughout his entire life, and is said to have turned over the proceeds from his encomiendas to improve native villages. Today, ancient Indian tribes and reservations persist in Mexico and the American Southwest. In the cities Onate founded, many streets, businesses, and geographic locations bear his name. He established a dynasty that retained wealth and power for 300 years.

Cristobal died in Pánuco, Zacatecas, on October 6, 1567, and was interred in the parochial church there.

See also
 Juan de Oñate
 Guadalajara
 Tepic
 Compostela, Nayarit
 Nuño Beltrán de Guzmán
 Nueva Galicia

Notes
 This article, unless otherwise noted,  is a free translation of the Spanish Wikipedia article Cristóbal de Oñate accessed February 19, 2007.

References

External links
 Genealogy of the family
Flint, Richard, Shirley Cushing Flint, Kevin Comerford, et al. Cristóbal de Oñate A Most Splendid Company. University of New Mexico Libraries.
 Porras Munoz, Gullermo, "La Calle de Cadena en Mexico," pps. 1-46.

1504 births
1567 deaths
Basque conquistadors
People from Vitoria-Gasteiz
Spanish soldiers
Encomenderos
History of Mexico
Guadalajara, Jalisco
Spanish city founders
People of New Spain
Spanish emigrants to Mexico
Basque explorers